Polikúshka: The Lot of a Wicked Court Servant ("Поликушка") is a novella by Leo Tolstoy written in 1860 and first published in 1862.  According to Tolstoy's translator, Aylmer Maude, it is the story of a serf who loses some money that belongs to his mistress before hanging himself.

Influence

According to literary critic and translator Leo Wiener, the book (along with The Cossacks) "evoked a mass of very favourable criticism," even receiving compliments from Ivan Turgenev, who traditionally opposed Tolstoy's works.  Oscar Wilde purchased a copy, along with The Pursuit of Happiness, and commented that Tolstoy can "crowd without overcrowding, the great canvas on which he works."

In 1922, it was made into a Soviet film: Polikushka.

See also
 Bibliography of Leo Tolstoy

References

External links

 Polikúshka: The Lot of a Wicked Court Servant, from RevoltLib.com
 Polikúshka: The Lot of a Wicked Court Servant, from Marxists.org
 Polikúshka: The Lot of a Wicked Court Servant, from TheAnarchistLibrary.org

Novels by Leo Tolstoy
1862 novels